Max White is a politician in the province of New Brunswick, Canada He was elected to the Legislative Assembly of New Brunswick in 1991 and defeated for re-election by Joan Kingston in 1995 for the re-distributed district of New Maryland.

He represented the electoral district of Sunbury as part of the Confederation of Regions party.

White became a member of the New Brunswick Progressive Conservative Party and supported Mike Allen in the 2016 Progressive Conservative Party leadership election

References 

New Brunswick Confederation of Regions Party MLAs
Living people
20th-century Canadian politicians
Year of birth missing (living people)
People from Sunbury County, New Brunswick